A khap is a community organisation representing a clan or a group of related clans. 

Khap can also refer to:

 Khap (film), 2011 Hindi film
 Khap, regional folk music style in Northern Laos; see Mor lam
 KHAP, Christian radio station in Chico, California